These are The Official UK Charts Company UK Dance Chart number one hits of 1995. The dates listed in the menus below represent the Saturday after the Sunday the chart was announced, as per the way the dates are given in chart publications such as the ones produced by Billboard, Guinness, and Virgin.

See also
1995 in music

References

External links
Dance Singles Chart at The Official UK Charts Company
UK Top 40 Dance Singles at BBC Radio 1

1995 record charts
1995 in British music
1995